Beaglichthys is a genus of viviparous brotulas.

Species
There are currently three recognized species in this genus:
 Beaglichthys bleekeri Schwarzhans & Møller, 2007
 Beaglichthys larsonae Schwarzhans & Møller, 2007
 Beaglichthys macrophthalmus Machida, 1993 (Beagle cusk)

References

Bythitidae